Czarface is an American hip hop supergroup formed in 2013 by underground hip hop duo 7L & Esoteric and Wu-Tang Clan member Inspectah Deck. They released their acclaimed debut album, Czarface, on February 19, 2013.
The album was followed by Every Hero Needs a Villain in 2015 and A Fistful of Peril in 2016, both of which were also praised by critics.

History
Inspectah Deck told Paul Meara of HipHopDX in February 2013, that the album had no goals, but to "create something worth listening to". Inspectah Deck had worked with 7L & Esoteric on tour and two previous tracks, the duo's song "Speaking Real Words" from the 2001 album The Soul Purpose and "12th Chamber" from their 2010 album 1212. Esoteric spoke of the album's origin as fun between friends, which ultimately led to a character that represented all three members.

Discography
Studio albums

Music videos

References

American hip hop groups
American musical trios
Hip hop supergroups